Kimah (also spelled Keema or Keiyimeh) is a village in northern Syria located west of Homs in the Homs Governorate. According to the Syria Central Bureau of Statistics, Kimah had a population of 508 in the 2004 census. Its inhabitants are predominantly Greek Orthodox Christians. The village has three Greek Orthodox Churches.

References

Bibliography

 

Populated places in Talkalakh District
Eastern Orthodox Christian communities in Syria
Christian communities in Syria